"Promise Me" is a 1990 hit song by British singer Beverley Craven. A ballad, it has become Craven's signature song and best known hit.

Released as the lead single of her debut album, Beverley Craven, in 1990, the song initially failed to chart. However, appearances in British TV and a successful UK tour prompted a re-release of the single, entering the charts in April 1991 and eventually peaking at number three in May. Its success helped her debut album also go to number three in the UK. The song also became successful when released around Europe.

Track listings
Both songs written by Beverley Craven.
 7" single / 3" CD single
 "Promise Me" — 3:35
 "I Listen to the Rain" — 2:55

Covers and sampling
The song has been covered numerous times, most notably being reworked as a dance song by group Lazard, who re-titled the song "4 O'Clock (In the Morning)". Other cover versions are by Jodie Brooke Wilson, Hind, Lutricia McNeal, Sandy Lam, Tabea, and by Rosa López who released a Spanish version (titled "") in 2008; a more faithful Spanish version was named "Entre tú y yo" and was performed by Mexican actress Chantal Andere in 1992 for her second album and as the main title song of the telenovela Triángulo.  Other notable covers are by Hong Kong Cantopop diva Sandy Lam titled as "Without You, But Still Love You", and Taiwanese Mandopop diva Winnie Hsin titled as "Selfish". Sometimes the Mandarin version and English version would be crossed over for singing competitions, as exemplified by English-Taiwanese singer (now newscaster) Annie Lin (林宜融).

In 2003, Faroese singer Guðrun Sólja Jacobsen's performance of this song won her the Danish talent show Stjerne for en aften. Subsequently, this performance spent a record-breaking 16 weeks at number 1 on Kringvarp Føroya's now defunct chart.

In 2007, Lea Salonga recorded the song for her album Inspired, a compilation of her own favorites.

In June 2012, Technoboy and Tuneboy sampled the song on their hardstyle single "Promise Me". Three months later, German techno band Scooter sampled "Promise Me" on their single "4 AM", in a nod to a 1993 breakbeat hardcore track by Orca, which also sampled verses from "Promise Me".

French rap artist La Fouine sampled the first verse of the song in his 2013 song "Quand je partirai". The single peaked at #74 in the French charts.

Also in 2013 German singer Tabea published a cover version on her album "Memories".

Charts

Weekly charts

Year-end charts

Certifications

Release history

References

1990 debut singles
1991 singles
1990s ballads
Pop ballads
Beverley Craven songs
Song recordings produced by Paul Samwell-Smith
1989 songs
Epic Records singles
CBS Records singles
Songs written by Beverley Craven